National Highway 707A, commonly referred to as NH 707A is a national highway in  India. It is a spur road of National Highway 7. NH-707A traverses the state of Uttarakhand in India.

Route 
NH707A connects Tiuni, Chakrata, Bhediyana, Mussoorie, New Tehri and Maletha near Srinagar in the state of Uttarakhand.

Junctions  

  Terminal near Tiuni.
  near New Tehri.
  at Maletha near Srinagar.

See also 

 List of National Highways in India
 List of National Highways in India by state

References

External links 

 NH 707A on OpenStreetMap
 Rationalisation of Numbering Systems of National Highways Department of Road Transport and Highways

National highways in India
National Highways in Uttarakhand